Lucien Lucius Nunn (16 March 1853 Medina, Ohio – 2 April 1925 Los Angeles, California) was an American entrepreneur and educator who founded the Telluride House, Telluride Association and Deep Springs College.  He received his higher education at Oberlin College and studied law at Harvard Law School.

Career

In 1880, Nunn moved to Telluride, Colorado, where he started a law practice and dealt in real estate.  By 1890 he had become involved in gold mining, journalism, and banking within the small community.  His bank, the First National Bank of Telluride, was the only bank in the county at the time. In order to help his mining operations prosper, Nunn financed the world’s first A/C power plant used for industrial purposes (mining), the Ames Hydroelectric Generating Plant. This plant, built by George Westinghouse, became part of the Nunn’s Telluride Power Company which would later become part of Utah Power and Light. Nunn continued investing in the power industry and helped design the Ontario Power Plant in Niagara Falls, Ontario.  To staff the power plants Nunn created a work study program called the Telluride Institute, headquartered near the Olmsted Power Plant, located in the Provo Canyon near Orem, Utah.  Upon completion of the course the graduates were sent on to gain further education through the issuance of scholarships.  Many of these students went on to study at Cornell University, where they resided at Telluride House, managed by Telluride Association, which Nunn founded.

Nunn was forced to sell his portion of Telluride Power in 1912 due to disagreements with other stockholders, which led to the closure of the Olmsted educational site and the suspension of the Telluride Institute program.

Accomplishments
The Telluride Association at Cornell (and in time elsewhere) remained, and still remains, in existence.  Its mission eventually expanded to encompass a variety of intellectually intense residential houses for college students, summer programs for high school students, scholarships, and other activities, all coeducational. Finally he founded Deep Springs College in 1917, a highly regarded two-year college built on the "Swinging T Ranch" in the remote Deep Springs Valley, California.  The college is similar in style to the Telluride Institute, in that students must work while completing their academic requirements and are engaged in a significant measure of self-governance.  The New Yorker described the style of education Nunn established at Deep Springs as "a novel form of education, a mix of Christian mysticism, imperialist elitism, Boy Scout-like abstinence, and Progressive era learning-by-doing, with an emphasis on leadership training and the formation of strong character."
He financially supported American zoologist Charles Otis Whitman's work. Whitman was married to Nunn's sister Emily, herself a zoologist.

Death and burial

Nunn died in 1925 as a result of tuberculosis which he contracted a decade earlier.  He was interred at Forest Lawn Memorial Park, Glendale, California.

References

 L.L. Nunn timeline from Fort Lewis College Foundation, Center of Southwest Studies
 L.L. Nunn papers from Cornell University
 L.L. Nunn page from Deep Springs College
 L.L. Nunn page from the Telluride Association
 Stephen A. Bailey (1933). "L.L. Nunn: a Memoir". Ithaca, NY: Telluride Association

Further reading

 Newell, L. Jackson (2015). The Electric Edge of Academe: The Saga of Lucien L. Nunn and Deep Springs College. Salt Lake City: University of Utah Press, 

Telluride Association
1853 births
1925 deaths
American energy industry businesspeople
Oberlin College alumni
Burials at Forest Lawn Memorial Park (Glendale)
Harvard Law School alumni
19th-century American businesspeople
20th-century American businesspeople